The name Yancy has been used for two tropical cyclones in the northwestern Pacific Ocean.

Typhoon Yancy (1990), a Category 2 typhoon that affected China and the Philippines
Typhoon Yancy (1993), a Category 4 typhoon that struck Japan

Pacific typhoon set index articles